Mihály Horváth (20 October 1809, Szentes – 19 August 1878, Karlsbad) was a Hungarian Roman Catholic bishop, historian, and politician. He was an exponent of Hungarian nationalism with an emphasis on its historical culture.

Further reading
 Baar, Monika. Historians and Nationalism: East-Central Europe in the Nineteenth Century (2010) excerpt, pp 35–40 and passim

External links 
 His portrait
 His biography on the Szentes's Horváth Mihály Secondary School homepage
 His activity in the Hungarian Historical Society (in Hungarian: Magyar Történelmi Társulat).

1809 births
1878 deaths
People from Szentes
19th-century Hungarian historians
19th-century Roman Catholic bishops in Hungary
Education ministers of Hungary